Walter Joseph Donnelly (January 9, 1896 – November 13, 1970) was an American diplomat. He served as Ambassador to Costa Rica, Venezuela, Germany, among others.

Biography
Born in New Haven, Connecticut, Donnelly served in the United States Army during World War I. He went to the Central University of Venezuela and then to the Edmund A. Walsh School of Foreign Service at Georgetown University.

Career
He served as United States Ambassador to Costa Rica. During 1947-1950, he was made ambassador of Venezuela and he settled in Venezuela again in 1951, this time as the representative of U.S. Steel in South America. On July 18, 1952, he was nominated by then President, Harry Truman, as High Commissioner to Austria. From August 1, 1952 until December 11, 1952, Donnelly served as High Commissioner of the United States in Germany.

See also
 United States Ambassador to Austria
 United States Ambassador to Costa Rica
 United States Ambassador to Venezuela

References

1896 births
1970 deaths
Military personnel from New Haven, Connecticut
Central University of Venezuela alumni
Walsh School of Foreign Service alumni
Ambassadors of the United States to Austria
Ambassadors of the United States to Costa Rica
Ambassadors of the United States to Venezuela
United States Foreign Service personnel